The 2007 Valencia Superbike World Championship round was the fourth round of the 2007 Superbike World Championship. It took place on the weekend of April 13–15, 2007 at the 4.005 km Circuit de Valencia in Spain.

Superbike race 1 classification

Superbike race 2 classification

Supersport classification

References
 Superbike Race 1
 Superbike Race 2
 Supersport Race

Valencia Round
Superbike World Championship round
Superbike World Championship round